Kenta Kano (born 2 May 1986) is a Japanese former footballer who played as an attacking midfielder.

J-League Firsts
 Appearance: 24 April 2005. Yokohama F. Marinos 1 vs 2 Omiya Ardija, Nissan Stadium
 Goal: 15 April 2006. Yokohama F. Marinos 3 vs 4 Gamba Osaka, Nissan Stadium

Club career stats
Updated to end of 2018 season.

References

External links

Profile at Yokohama F. Marinos 

1986 births
Living people
Association football people from Shizuoka Prefecture
Japanese footballers
J1 League players
J2 League players
Yokohama F. Marinos players
Kashiwa Reysol players
Kawasaki Frontale players
Tokushima Vortis players
Association football midfielders